In graph theory, two graphs  and  are homeomorphic if there is a graph isomorphism from some subdivision of  to some subdivision of .  If the edges of a graph are thought of as lines drawn from one vertex to another (as they are usually depicted in illustrations), then two graphs are homeomorphic to each other in the graph-theoretic sense precisely if they are homeomorphic in the topological sense.

Subdivision and smoothing 
In general, a subdivision of a graph G (sometimes known as an expansion) is a graph resulting from the subdivision of edges in G. The subdivision of some edge e with endpoints {u,v&hairsp;} yields a graph containing one new vertex w, and with an edge set replacing e by two new edges, {u,w&hairsp;} and {w,v&hairsp;}.

For example, the edge e, with endpoints {u,v&hairsp;}:

can be subdivided into two edges, e1 and e2, connecting to a new vertex w:

The reverse operation, smoothing out or smoothing  a vertex w with regards to the pair of edges (e1, e2) incident on w, removes both edges containing w and replaces (e1, e2) with a new edge that connects the other endpoints of the pair. Here, it is emphasized that only degree-2 (i.e., 2-valent) vertices can be smoothed.

For example, the simple connected graph with two edges, e1 {u,w&hairsp;} and e2 {w,v&hairsp;}: 

has a vertex (namely w) that can be smoothed away, resulting in:

Determining whether for graphs G and H, H is homeomorphic to a subgraph of G, is an NP-complete problem.

Barycentric subdivisions

The barycentric subdivision subdivides each edge of the graph.  This is a special subdivision, as it always results in a bipartite graph.  This procedure can be repeated, so that the nth barycentric subdivision is the barycentric subdivision of the n−1st barycentric subdivision of the graph.  The second such subdivision is always a simple graph.

Embedding on a surface
It is evident that subdividing a graph preserves planarity.  Kuratowski's theorem states that 
 a finite graph is planar if and only if it contains no subgraph homeomorphic to K5 (complete graph on five vertices) or K3,3 (complete bipartite graph on six vertices, three of which connect to each of the other three).

In fact, a graph homeomorphic to K5 or K3,3 is called a Kuratowski subgraph.

For example,  consists of the Kuratowski subgraphs.

Example
In the following example, graph G and graph H are homeomorphic.

If G′ is the graph created by subdivision of the outer edges of G and H′ is the graph created by subdivision of the inner edge of H, then G′ and H′ have a similar graph drawing:

Therefore, there exists an isomorphism between G' and H', meaning G and H are homeomorphic.

See also
Minor (graph theory)
Edge contraction

References

Further reading

Graph theory
Homeomorphisms